The 1993 Australian Individual Speedway Championship was held at the Brisbane Exhibition Ground in Brisbane, Queensland on 30 January 1993. Defending champion Leigh Adams won his second straight Australian Championship. Fellow Mildura rider Jason Lyons finished second with Adelaide's Shane Bowes finishing third. Another Adelaide rider (though riding under the Western Australian flag) Craig Hodgson defeated Queensland champion Troy Butler to claim fourth place.

1993 Australian Solo Championship
 30 January 1993
  Brisbane - Brisbane Exhibition Ground
 Referee: 
 Qualification: The top four riders plus one reserve go through to the Commonwealth Final in King's Lynn, England.

Classification

References

See also
 Australia national speedway team
 Sport in Australia

Speedway in Australia
Australia
Individual Speedway Championship